Cry 'Havoc'  is a 1943 American war drama film, produced by Metro-Goldwyn-Mayer and directed by Richard Thorpe. It stars Margaret Sullavan, Ann Sothern and  Joan Blondell, and features Fay Bainter, Marsha Hunt, Ella Raines, Frances Gifford, Diana Lewis, Heather Angel, Dorothy Morris and Connie Gilchrist.

Background
The film is based on a play by Allan R. Kenward which opened in Hollywood, California in September 1942. The play was also presented on Broadway, under the title Proof Thro' the Night with Carol Channing, Florence Rice and Ann Shoemaker. However, the play was not successful, opening on December 25, 1942 and closing January 2, 1943 after 11 performances. The title comes from a famous line in Shakespeare's Julius Caesar: "Cry 'Havoc!', and let slip the dogs of war."

Plot
This is the story of thirteen women. Only two of them—Captain Alice Marsh and Lieutenant Mary Smith—were members of the armed forces of the United States. The others were civilians—American women who, until that fateful day in December, knew no more of war than did you or your nearest neighbor.

The film tells the story of 13 American women, two Army nurses and 11 civilians. It is set in a field hospital during the Battle of Bataan (January–April 9, 1942) against the inexorable advance of Japanese forces down the peninsula during the early months of the United States' involvement in World War II. At the beginning of the film, the head nurse, Lt. Mary “Smitty” Smith (Margaret Sullavan) and her superior, Capt. Alice Marsh (Fay Bainter)  talk about their desperate need for supplies, especially quinine: Men are surviving surgery only to die of malaria. Smith jokes grimly that she could also use three  dozen well-trained nurses. Marsh has a plan to look for volunteers among the several thousand refugees streaming from Manila. Marsh also tells a resistant Smith that there is only one chance for her—she must join the evacuees bound for Corregidor, and thence to Australia, where new medicines may save her. Smith has a deadly form of malaria.

Nurse Flo Norris (Marsha Hunt) returns from Mariveles with what supplies she could find; 9 women civilian refugees from various backgrounds are pushing the truck. They lack experience and training and at first find it difficult to adjust to all the horrors of their work and living in close quarters under constant fire. From the beginning, Pat Conlin (Ann Sothern) rebels against Lt. Smith's oversight, saying she has always hated taking orders from a woman.

Pat becomes infatuated with a male officer, Lt. Holt (uncredited Jack Randall, whose voice is heard but who is seen only at a distance) and deliberately makes a play for him, continuing even after Norris tells her that Smitty has a special relationship with Holt. The audience sees Smitty talking to Holt on the phone; it sounds as if they are deeply in love. Pat has a friendly relationship with Holt, who shares information with her when she is working the switchboard outside his office. The jealousy between the two women is made worse by the fact that Smitty must constantly reprimand Pat for ignoring regulations and doing dangerous things such as lighting cigarettes outside at night.

As time goes on, we see the women mastering their fear and dealing with almost every conceivable challenge, from tending the wounded; enduring a diet of horse meat, mule meat and monkey meat; picking up pieces of bodies to tallying the personal effects of the dead. A soldier (Robert Mitchum) dies in Connie's (Ella Raines) arms with the words “I'm all right.”

On their first day, just before an air-raid, one of the volunteers, Sue West (Dorothy Morris), steps outside and disappears. Her sister Andra (Heather Angel) searches for her frantically. After four days, she is found alive, trapped in a shelter with 6 dead bodies, in a state of shock.  She is given a quiet bed in the storeroom. Their troubles bring the women closer, and they discuss their hopes for the future. Grace (Joan Blondell), a former burlesque performer, dances for the group to break the tension, but then, off screen, Sue screams.

The hospital is attacked repeatedly. Grace's leg is wounded, and she loses her temper with Smitty, throwing Pat's relationship with Holt in her face. Smitty flees for the phone and calls Holt. Grace apologizes.

Smitty tells the women that the military have been told to dig in, but the volunteers may leave Bataan and go to Corregidor. She warns them that what they have experienced is nothing compared to what will come. After some discussion, they all decide to remain and help as best they can.

Six weeks later, the Japanese artillery is getting closer and the women learn that MacArthur is in Australia. Pat vows to get the lowdown and goes into Holts office. Three of the women go swimming, thrilled by 15 minutes' possession of a precious cake of soap. A Japanese plane strafes them, and Connie is killed. Dispirited, the women feel they cannot win, but Pat declares “We can't lose!” Using a map she got from Holt, she describes to the nurses—and to the wartime audience—how resistance has thwarted Japanese plans for easy conquest.

An angry Smitty tells Pat to stay away from the switchboard and by implication Holt and, shaking with fever, orders Pat to leave the room. Flo wants to call the Captain to help, but Smitty begs her not to because they will send her away. She reveals to Flo that she married Lt. Holt in November and joined the service to be with him. It is against the rules for officers and nurses to be married, so they have been keeping their marriage a secret. Smitty also puts a name to her disease, “malignant malaria.” Flo promises to keep her secrets.

Evacuation is underway, the lines are cut, and artillery fire  stops. When the Pat  learns that Lt. Holt has been killed, she is miserable. Smitty, who doesn't know about Holt, asks if Pat can't take it, and Diana (Nydia Joyce) tells Smitty that Pat's boyfriend, Lt. Holt, has just been killed. Smitty, struggling for control, goes into his office, looks around, takes out the ring she wears around her neck on a chain and tries it on.

Back in the barracks, Pat admits that she never had a chance with Holt. He never even made a pass at her. She wonders aloud, he couldn't possibly be fond of Smitty, could he? Flo tells Pat that they were in fact married and that Smitty has malignant malaria, which will kill her. She sacrificed herself to stay close to her husband. Pat asks, Why didn't she say something? It is clear that Pat would not come between husband and wife. There are sounds of sniper fire, then tanks, then machine guns. A Japanese soldier tells the women to come out with their hands over their heads. As they leave their underground barracks, Pat hands Smitty the nearly empty bottle of quinine. Smitty apologizes to Pat for not telling her about Holt, and Pat admits that he never gave her a tumble. They walk out together.

Cast

Cast notes:
 The film features a very early appearance by Robert Mitchum, who is briefly seen as a dying soldier.  It also marks the final performance by Diana Lewis, who retired following her marriage to William Powell.
 Gloria Grafton made her screen debut in this film.

Production
Allan R. Kenward's play opened in a small Hollywood theatre in September 1942 under the title Cry 'Havoc, and two weeks later, in October 1942, MGM bought the rights to it for #20,000.  Broadway producer Lee Shubert received a waiver from the Dramatists Guild to produce the play on Broadway: normally, this could not have happened until one year after a movie of the play had been released.  The waiver was granted due to the subject's timeliness, and the show opened on Broadway on December 25, 1942 under the title Proof Thro the Night.  The title was changed back to Cry 'Havoc, possibly because the production did not receive good reviews.  MGM paid an additional $15,000 for the rights to the Broadway production.

Mervyn LeRoy was originally slated to direct the film, as he was also scheduled to film the Broadway production as a reference, but it is unclear if this ever happened. LeRoy was replaced by Richard Thorpe in April 1943.

A large number of actresses were considered for the roles in the film. Joan Crawford was announced to play "Smitty", then was changed to play "Pat" against Merle Oberon playing "Smitty". Actresses considered for various roles between December 1942 and May 1943 include  June Allyson, Eve Arden, Mary Elliott, Bonita Granville, Laura La Plante, Diana Lynn, Marilyn Maxwell, Kay Medford, June Millarde, Susan Peters, Frances Rafferty, Donna Reed, Helene Reynolds, Ann Sheridan, Mary Treen, Lana Turner, Elena Verdugo, and Tsing, a Chinese ingenue.

Cry 'Havoc''' was in productions from May 13 to June 30, 1943, with additional scenes shot from July 18–20 and from September 16 to late September 1943. Location shooting took place in Pico, California.

The film's Technical director, Col. Milton A. Hill, was  General Douglas MacArthur's Inspector General, and was on the last submarine to leave Corregidor.

Response
The film was considered topical, with Bataan often in the news at the time, and proved to be profitable. The film writer, John Douglas Eames, commented that much of the film was theatrical rather than cinematic, and he also noted that "some of the girls seemed to have found a beauty salon on Bataan". Leonard Maltin also noted that its stage origins were obvious, but that it offered a "pretty honest picture of war".

References

External links

 
 
 
 
 [http://www.tvguide.com/movies/cry-havoc/review/111899/ Cry 'Havoc'] at TV Guide (slightly revised version of the 1987 write-up originally published in The Motion Picture Guide'')

1943 films
1940s war drama films
American war drama films
American black-and-white films
1940s English-language films
American films based on plays
Films directed by Richard Thorpe
Films scored by Daniele Amfitheatrof
Metro-Goldwyn-Mayer films
Pacific War films
World War II films made in wartime
Films set in the Philippines
Films about nurses
1943 drama films
Films about disability